Songs for Our Mothers is the second studio album by British post-punk band Fat White Family. It was released in January 2016 under Fat Possum Records.

Track listing

Charts

References

2016 albums
Fat Possum Records albums
Post-punk albums by British artists